Sadush Danaj (born 6 November 1988) is an Albanian football player who currently plays for KF Burreli in the Albanian First Division.

References

1988 births
Living people
People from Lezhë
Association football defenders
Albanian footballers
Besëlidhja Lezhë players
KF Vllaznia Shkodër players
KF Laçi players
KF Tërbuni Pukë players
KS Burreli players
KF Shënkolli players
Besa Kavajë players
Kategoria Superiore players
Kategoria e Parë players